Magdalena Apasco  is a town and municipality in Oaxaca in south-western Mexico. The municipality covers an area of 29.34 km². 
It is part of the Etla District in the Valles Centrales region.

As of 2005, the municipality had a total population of 6148.

References

Municipalities of Oaxaca